Apatelodes banepa is a moth in the family Apatelodidae. It is found in south-eastern Peru.

The forewings are greyish brown with two small white spots close to the apex, edged with black on the inner side. There is a large elongated dark brown spot close to the base on the inner margin, and there are three black zigzag lines across the wing from the costal to the inner margin. The hindwings are pale reddish brown, crossed about the middle by an indistinct whitish line.

References

Apatelodidae
Moths described in 1904
Taxa named by Herbert Druce